Enrique Castillo (Enrique Jimenez Castillo) (born December 10, 1949) is an American actor, writer, director, and producer. He founded Four Brown Hats Entertainment (FBHE) and was a founding member of the Latino Theater Company.

Life and career 
Castillo was born in Calexico, California, and is founding member of The Latino Theater Company. He co-wrote the company's plays Stone Wedding and August 29. In addition to the plays, he wrote and directed the film The History of The Latino Theater Company, a documentary chronicling the theater company, and co-produced the company's annual comedy fundraiser Noche de Risa y Susto.

Castillo was cast in the role of Smiley Torres in 1978 stage production of Zoot Suit, and later went on to take on the titular role of Henry Reyna.   

Castillo is most recognized for his role as Montana in feature film Blood In Blood Out, directed by Taylor Hackford.

In 1997, Castillo created Four Brown Hats Entertainment (FBHE), a film and theater production company. With FBHE, he adapted and directed The Last Angry Brown Hat. Following this, he wrote and directed Veteranos: A Legacy of Valor, a theater piece honoring the military contributions by Latinos in America's defense.

Among his completed feature film scripts are Yo Solo, The Cobra, Valley of the Dead, Deerdancer, and The Last Angry Brown Hat.

Filmography

References

1949 births
Living people
American male film actors
American male television actors
American male writers
20th-century American male actors
21st-century American male actors
People from Calexico, California